Dong District (literally east district) is a gu, or district, in central Ulsan, South Korea.
Its name literally means "East Ward".

Administrative divisions 
Dong district is further divided into neighbourhoods. These neighbourhoods include:
Bangeo-dong (방어동)
Daesong-dong (대송동)
Hwajeong-dong (화정동)
Ilsan-dong (일산동)
Jeonha 1-dong (전하1동)
Jeonha 2-dong (전하2동)
Nammok 1-dong (남목1동)
Nammok 2-dong (남목2동)
Nammok 3-dong (남목3동)
---

Education 
Ulsan College (East Campus)

See also
List of districts in South Korea

References

External links 
Dong-gu website